The Hotel Utah may refer to:
 Hotel Utah, San Francisco, California
 Hotel Utah, now known as the Joseph Smith Memorial Building, Salt Lake City, Utah